Condylostylus nigrofemoratus is a species of longlegged fly in the family Dolichopodidae.

References

Further reading

External links

 

Sciapodinae
Taxa named by Francis Walker (entomologist)
Insects described in 1849